Herimosa albovenata, the white-veined skipper, is a butterfly of the family Hesperiidae. It is found in Australia in inland New South Wales, South Australia and Western Australia.

The larvae feed on Austrostipa scabra, Austrostipa semibarbata, Austrostipa falcata and Austrostipa eremophila.

Subspecies
Herimosa albovenata albovenata
Herimosa albovenata fuscata
Herimosa albovenata weemala

External links
 Australian Caterpillars

Trapezitinae
Butterflies described in 1940